This is a list of the members of the 25th Seanad Éireann, the upper house of the Oireachtas (legislature) of Ireland. 49 Senators were elected in April 2016 when postal voting closed. The Taoiseach nominated an additional eleven members to the Seanad in May 2016. The Seanad election took place after the 2016 general election to Dáil Éireann.

Electoral system
There are 60 seats in the Seanad: 43 Senators are elected by the Vocational panels, 6 elected by the two University constituencies, and 11 are nominated by the Taoiseach. Three seats are elected by graduates of the National University of Ireland and three seats are elected by graduates and scholars of the Dublin University.

Article 18.8 of the Constitution requires that an election for Seanad Éireann must take place not later than 90 days after a dissolution of the Dáil. On 9 February, Minister for the Environment, Community and Local Government Alan Kelly signed the orders for the Seanad Election.

Nominations for the 43 Vocational panel seats closed at noon on 21 March 2016 and the full list of panel nominees was published in Iris Oifigiúil on 1 April 2016.
Polls for these two university constituencies closed at 11.00 a.m. on Tuesday 26 April 2016.

Forty-three Vocational panel seats in the Seanad are filled by an electorate of public representatives, comprising the incoming 32nd Dáil, the outgoing 24th Seanad, and members of city and county councils, each of whom has one vote in each of the five panels. The total electorate was 1,155. Polling closed at 11 a.m. on Monday 25 April 2016, with the count beginning immediately afterwards. A total of 1,124 of the electorate voted. Each panel is subdivided into an Oireachtas ("inside") subpanel and Nominating Bodies ("outside") subpanel, and a portion of seats must be filled from each subpanel; John Dolan was elected despite having fewer votes than Tom Sheahan and Thomas Welby when they were eliminated, because they were on the inside panel and all remaining seats were reserved for the outside panel.

Taoiseach Enda Kenny nominated 11 senators on 27 May 2016.

The 25th Seanad first met at Leinster House on 8 June 2016 when Denis O'Donovan was elected as the new Cathaoirleach of the Seanad.

The Government of the 32nd Dáil was a minority government of Fine Gael and several independent TDs, supported by Fianna Fáil. Similarly, Fine Gael did not hold a majority in the Seanad: and even if all 20 Fine Gael Senators voted in favour of a motion, and all 14 Fianna Fáil Senators abstained, four more votes from independent or opposition Senators were required to pass a motion. There were several very close votes and defeats. This was unusual, as the Senators nominated by the Taoiseach usually give the Government a majority.

Composition of the 25th Seanad

Government party denoted with bullet.Party giving confidence and supply denoted by C.

Technical groups
The minimum parliamentary group size is five Senators, a threshold met by Fine Gael, Fianna Fáil, Sinn Féin, and the following three technical groups. Apart from the Cathaoirleach, independent Marie-Louise O'Donnell was the only senator not a member of any group.

Independent group (9)

All were independents, although not all independent senators were members of the group.

Civil Engagement group (5)

All members of the Civil Engagement group were first-time Oireachtas members and independents. This group included Grace O'Sullivan (Green Party) until her election to the European Parliament in May 2019.

Technical group (5)

All were in Labour except for independent Norris. Labour formed a party group until the retirement of Denis Landy left it below the five-senator threshold. It first formed a technical group with Trevor Ó Clochartaigh, who had resigned from Sinn Féin. When Ó Clochartaigh resigned from the Seanad, Labour recruited Norris, who had left the Independent group shortly after the 2016 election.

List of senators

Changes

See also
Members of the 32nd Dáil
Government of the 32nd Dáil

References

External links
How the Seanad is Elected – Department of Housing, Planning and Local Government

 
25